The 1982 NCAA Division I-AA football season, part of college football in the United States organized by the National Collegiate Athletic Association at the Division I-AA level, began in August 1982 and concluded with the 1982 NCAA Division I-AA Football Championship Game on December 18, 1982, at Memorial Stadium in Wichita Falls, Texas. The Eastern Kentucky Colonels won their second I-AA championship, defeating the Delaware Fightin' Blue Hens in the Pioneer Bowl, 17−14.

Conference changes and new programs
Before the 1982 season, a total of 41 NCAA Division I-A teams, including three conferences and all of their members, were shifted from Division I-A to Division I-AA: 
 Ivy League — Brown, Columbia, Cornell, Dartmouth, Harvard, Pennsylvania, Princeton, and Yale
 Southern Conference — Appalachian State, Chattanooga, East Tennessee State, Furman, Marshall, The Citadel, VMI, and Western Carolina
 Southland Conference — Arkansas State, Lamar, Louisiana Tech, McNeese State, and Texas–Arlington
 Southwestern Louisiana, who had been a member of the Southland during the 1981 season, remained in Division I-A as an Independent.

Most of the Missouri Valley Conference football schools were also reclassified. This began the few years where the MVC hosted both I-A and I-AA teams. Drake, Illinois State, Indiana State, Southern Illinois, and West Texas State did not meet I-A standards and were reclassified to I-AA, while New Mexico State, Tulsa, and Wichita State remained in I-A.

Independent Cincinnati and MAC schools Ball State, Bowling Green, Eastern Michigan, Kent State, Miami (OH), Northern Illinois, Ohio, and Western Michigan were all reclassified as well.

The University of Cincinnati filed an injunction against the NCAA to postpone their demotion until after the 1982 season, and was successful in remaining in I-A.

Of the ten schools in the MAC, initially only Central Michigan and Toledo maintained I-A status. Bowling Green, Northern Illinois, Miami, and Western Michigan all made appeals and the conference as a whole was granted the ability to remain at the I-A level.

Conference standings

Conference champions

Postseason
The playoffs expanded from eight to twelve teams this season; four years later, in 1986, the field was expanded to sixteen teams.

NCAA Division I-AA playoff bracket
The top four teams were seeded, and received first-round byes.

* Next to team name denotes host institution

References